Phyllobaenus is a genus of checkered beetles in the family Cleridae. There are at least 60 described species in Phyllobaenus.

Species
These 62 species belong to the genus Phyllobaenus:

References

Further reading

External links

 

Cleridae